Tonawanda High School is a public high school located in the City of Tonawanda, New York, United States. It is part of the Tonawanda City School District.

The school's football field was at one time the home of the Tonawanda Kardex, a professional football team, which achieved fame by playing in just one game as a member of the National Football League in 1921. The Kardex would sometimes draw up to 3,500 fans for a game. However, NFL records list the nonexistent "Lumbermen Stadium" as the team's home field.

Notable alumni
 1941: Charles DeGlopper, recipient of the Congressional Medal of Honor for his actions in World War II 
 1962: Jim Britton, Major League Baseball pitcher
 1963: Rick Cassata, CFL quarterback
 1973: Dave Geisel (1955- ), Major League Baseball pitcher
 1977: Glen Cook (baseball) (1959- ), Major League Baseball pitcher

References

External links
http://www.tonawandacsd.org/site/Default.aspx?PageID=1614

1895 establishments in New York (state)
Educational institutions established in 1895
Public high schools in New York (state)
Schools in Erie County, New York